The Florida Department of Military Affairs is a state agency of the state of Florida, which was created by Chapter 250, Florida Statutes. The department is responsible for providing management oversight and administrative support to the Florida National Guard. The two branches of the Florida National Guard, the Florida Army National Guard and the Florida Air National Guard, fall under the command of the state Adjutant General, an appointee of the Governor of Florida, and fall under the command of the Governor of Florida.

Florida Army National Guard

The Florida Army National Guard has a dual federal and state mission. When in federal service, it acts as a reserve component of the United States Army. When activated by the state of Florida, the Army National Guard is tasked with emergency relief support during natural disasters such as floods, earthquakes and forest fires; search and rescue operations; support to civil defense authorities; maintenance of vital public services, and counterdrug operations.

Florida Air National Guard

The Florida Air National Guard has a dual federal and state mission. When in federal service, it acts as a reserve component of the United States Air Force. Like the Florida Army National Guard, when activated by the state of Florida, the Florida Air National Guard may be deployed to support emergency services operations. In addition, the Air National Guard has complete responsibility for the air defense of the United States.

Florida State Guard

The Florida State Defense Force is the state defense force of Florida. The FSG was created in 1941 to serve as a stateside replacement for the Florida National Guard while the National Guard was deployed abroad during World War II. The FSG is available to the governor of Florida whenever needed, but unlike the National Guard, the FSG is trained and funded by the state and therefore can not be federalized. The FSG was reactivated in 2022 after the Florida legislature appropriated US$10 million in funding.

Inactive components

Florida Naval Militia

The Florida Naval Militia is the currently inactive naval militia of Florida. The Governor of Florida is permitted, under Florida law, to organize a naval militia and a marine corps in accordance with federal law governing the Naval Militia or Marine Corps of the United States and regulations issued by the Secretary of the Navy.

References

External links
Florida Department of Military Affairs Official Website

Military in Florida
State agencies of Florida